Ust-Kumir (Kayrukun) is a rural locality (a selo) and the administrative centre of Talitskoye Rural Settlement, Ust-Kansky District, the Altai Republic, Russia. The population was 501 as of 2016. There are 11 streets.

Geography 
Ust-Kumir is located 38 km northwest of Ust-Kan (the district's administrative centre) by road. Talitsa is the nearest rural locality.

References 

Rural localities in Ust-Kansky District